The 1994–95 FIS Cross-Country World Cup was a multi-race tournament over a season for cross-country skiers. It was the 14th official World Cup season in cross-country skiing for men and women. The World Cup was organised by the International Ski Federation who also run world cups and championships in ski jumping, snowboarding and alpine skiing amongst others.

Bjørn Dæhlie reclaimed the crystal World Cup globe which Vladimir Smirnov had won in the 1993–94 season, thus taking his third overall men's World Cup title in four seasons. Smirnov won more races, with six wins including three during the 1995 World Championships, but Dæhlie was usually the runner-up. Also, one of Smirnov's World Championship wins didn't count towards the overall standings. Silvio Fauner, Harri Kirvesniemi, Torgny Mogren and Alexey Prokurorov also registered World Cup wins during the season.

In the women's Cup, Yelena Välbe won the six first events, and eventually won nine of the 15 races including one gold at the World Championships. Russians occupied the top five spots in the women's World Cup, with multiple races having three or more Russians on top of the standings. Only the Lahti 10 km was not won by a Russian skier, and in 11 of the 15 races did Russians occupy the top two spots in the standings. According to the Norwegian publication Sportsboken, the Russian women had not been this dominant since the 1970s.

Calendar

Men

Women

Men's team

Women's team

Overall results

Below are tables showing the number of points won in the 1994–95 FIS Cross-Country World Cup for men and women.

11 races counted towards the total; the 9 best of the 11 races outside the World Championships, as well as the two best World Championship races.

Men

Women

Achievements
Victories in this World Cup (all-time number of victories as of 1994/95 season in parentheses)

Men
 , 6 (22) first places
 , 5 (24) first places
 , 1 (13) first place
 , 1 (6) first place
 , 1 (5) first place
 , 1 (1) first place

Women
 , 9 (33) first places
 , 4 (7) first places
 , 2 (2) first places
 , 1 (4) first place

Notes

References
FIS Official Site World Cup Results
 Sportsboken 95-96, ed. Arvid Eriksen, Schibsted, .

External links
FIS Official Site World Cup Results

World Cup 1994-95
World Cup 1994-95
FIS Cross-Country World Cup seasons